The Shamkir reservoir is a large reservoir in the Shamkir Rayon of northwestern Azerbaijan. It is the
second largest reservoir in the Caucasus after the Mingachevir reservoir.

Overview 
The Shamkir reservoir was built on the Shamkir section of the Kura River in 1982. The overall volume of the reservoir is 2,677 million m3 and the exploited volume of water is 1,425 million m3.
A 380 megawatt hydroelectric power station with 2 turbines is a part of the reservoir complex.

New Shamkir reservoir
A new reservoir in Shamkir Rayon was completed in 2014 by the Azerbaijani government on the Shamkirchay river. 
The main purpose of the new reservoir is to provide irrigation water to Shamkir, Samukh Goygol and Goranboy raions. The project was initiated by the President of Azerbaijan, Ilham Aliyev, in 2009 and will cost $400 million. The construction of the reservoir and dam will last three years. Over 50 pieces of heavy machinery and 240 laborers are currently involved in construction. The reservoir will have a volume capacity of 160 million m3 and an average water flow of 260 million m3, and will also provide more drinking water to the city of Shamkir. The maximum length at the new reservoir will be . The top length of the dam will be , width - . Over 85,000 m3 of concrete and 7,000 metal structures and fittings will be used for construction of the dam. Also, a 36 megawatt hydroelectric power station will be built at the reservoir. The annual energy production of the station will be 56 million kWh. The construction is being carried out by a Turkish company.

See also 
 Rivers and lakes in Azerbaijan

References

External links 
 Satellite image of Shemkir Reservoir

Reservoirs in Azerbaijan
Reservoirs built in the Soviet Union
Shamkir District